Windjammer is an album recorded in 1976 by jazz trumpeter Freddie Hubbard. It was released on the Columbia label and features performances by Hubbard, Jon Faddis, Michael Brecker, Bob James, George Cables Steve Khan and Eric Gale.

Critical reception

Scott Yanow of AllMusic calls Windjammer "probably Freddie Hubbard's worst recording" and lambasts the music as dated and shallow.

Track listing

All compositions by Freddie Hubbard except as indicated

 "Dream Weaver" (Gary Wright) – 5:26
 "Feelings" (Loulou Gasté, Morris Albert) – 5:56
 "Rock Me Arms" (Ralph MacDonald, William Salter, Zachary Sanders, Fareil Glenn) – 5:51
 "Touch Me Baby" (Bob James) – 7:05
 "Neo Terra (New Land)" – 5:01
 "Windjammer" – 4:59

Recorded at Mediasound and Columbia Studio B, New York City

Personnel
Freddie Hubbard – trumpet
Jon Faddis: trumpet
Michael Brecker: tenor saxophone
Bob James: piano, clavinet, synthesizer
George Cables: electric piano, clavinet
Hubert Laws: flute
Steve Khan: guitar
Richie Resnicoff: guitar
David Spinozza: guitar
Eric Gale: guitar
Jerry Friedman: guitar

Gary King: bass
Steve Gadd: drums
Andy Newmark: drums
Chris Parker: drums
Ralph MacDonald: percussion
Ray Mantilla: percussion
Marvin Stamm: trumpet
Bernie Glow: trumpet
Lew Soloff: trumpet
Wayne Andre: trombone
Dave Taylor: trombone
Alan Raph: trombone
George Marge: oboe, alto saxophone, English horn
Wally Kane: bassoon
Phil Bodner: alto saxophone

Max Ellen: violin
David Nadien: violin
Emanuel "Manny" Green: violin
Harry Cykman: violin
Charles Libove: violin
Harry Lookofsky: violin
Max Pollikoff: violin
Paul Gershman: violin
Matthew Raimondi: violin
Richard Sortomme: violin
Alfred Brown: viola
Emanuel Vardi: viola
Charles McCracken: cello
Jesse Levy: cello

Patti Austin: vocals
Vivian Cherry: vocals
Gwen Guthrie: vocals
Zack Sanders: vocals
Frank Floyd: vocals

References

Freddie Hubbard albums
1976 albums
Albums produced by Bob James (musician)
Columbia Records albums